George Heron (born 28 April 1962) is a Jamaican cricketer. He played in four first-class matches for the Jamaican cricket team from 1985 to 1988.

See also
 List of Jamaican representative cricketers

References

External links
 

1962 births
Living people
Jamaican cricketers
Jamaica cricketers
People from Clarendon Parish, Jamaica